The Governor of the Department of Norte de Santander heads the executive branch of the government of the Colombian department of Norte de Santander. The governor is the highest-ranking official in the department, serving as the main agent for the President of Colombia to carry on the task of maintaining public order and the execution of the general economic policy, and all matters of law passed down for the nation. The current governor is William Villamizar Laguado.

The Department of Norte de Santander was created on July 25, 1910, before this the department formed part of the Department of Santander, and as such it was governed by the Governor of Santander.

Before the Colombian Constitution of 1991, the governor was appointed by the president. In 1992 popular elections were held for the first time to elect the governor of the Department for a period of three years.

References
 http://www.nortedesantander.gov.co/

Norte de Santander